Everyone into Position is the second studio album by British progressive/alternative rock band Oceansize, released on 19 September 2005 on Beggars Banquet. The album marked the final appearance of bassist Jon Ellis.

According to vocalist/guitarist Mike Vennart: "at the beginning of 'Ornament/The Last Wrongs' there are all these weird ambient noises and what it was is that a friend of ours was in the Amazon jungle and recorded all these parrots. They sounded like kids laughing and shouting, not parrots."

Use in media
"Music For A Nurse" was used in an ad campaign for Orange, while "Meredith" was used in an episode of the OC. Both "Music for a Nurse" and "Meredith" have also been used in the BBC drama series Waterloo Road. "Music For A Nurse" was used in the 2007 movie The Invisible during the ending and credits and was included on the soundtrack for the film.

Track listing
"The Charm Offensive" – 7:19
Contains the hidden track "Emp(irical) Error" in the pregap of the track
"Heaven Alive" – 6:20
"A Homage to a Shame" – 5:52
"Meredith" – 5:26
"Music for a Nurse" – 8:16
"New Pin" – 5:11
"No Tomorrow" – 7:10
"Mine Host" – 4:10
"You Can't Keep a Bad Man Down" – 7:36
"Ornament/The Last Wrongs" – 9:21

Personnel
Mike Vennart – vocals, guitar
Gambler – guitar
Steve Durose – guitar, vocals
Jon Ellis – bass
Mark Heron – drums

Production
Dan Austin – producer
Oceansize – producer
Dan Austin – engineer
Danton Supple – mixing
Rob Smith – mixing
Nick Webb – mastering

Charts

References

External links
 Album Lyrics

Oceansize albums
2005 albums
Beggars Banquet Records albums
Albums produced by Dan Austin